Niger competed at the 2019 World Aquatics Championships in Gwangju, South Korea from 12 to 28 July.

Swimming

Niger entered three swimmers.

Men

Women

References

Nations at the 2019 World Aquatics Championships
Niger at the World Aquatics Championships
World Aquatics Championships